Altenberg (Erzgebirge) is a railway station in the town of Altenberg, Saxony, Germany. The station lies on the Müglitz Valley Railway and the train services are operated by DB Regio Südost.

Train services
The station is served by the following service(s):
2x per day regional service (Wanderexpress Bohemica, summer weekends only) Dresden - Heidenau - Glashütte - Altenberg
1x per hour regional service (Müglitztalbahn) Heidenau - Glashütte - Altenberg

References
Deutsche Bahn website

External links

Network map

Railway stations in Saxony
Altenberg, Saxony